The following lists events that happened in 1942 in El Salvador.

Incumbents
President: Maximiliano Hernández Martínez 
Vice President: Vacant

Events

June

 6 June – The Cuscatlán Bridge was opened by President Maximiliano Hernández Martínez.

August

 6 August – The 1942 Guatemala earthquake was felt in El Salvador.

November
 26 November – El Monumento al Divino Salvador del Mundo was constructed in San Salvador. It remains one of the most iconic sites in El Salvor.

References

 
El Salvador
1940s in El Salvador
Years of the 20th century in El Salvador
El Salvador